HMS Beagle was a schooner of the Royal Navy, built by John Cuthbert, Millers Point, New South Wales and launched in December 1872.

She commenced service on the Australia Station at Sydney in 1873 for anti-blackbirding operations in the South Pacific. In April 1875, she ran aground on a reef in the Spanish East Indies. Her crew were rescued. She was paid off in 1883 and sold for £1,000.

Fate
Beagle was then sold to Messers Bell & Davis, who sailed to Peru after defrauding the Australian Mercantile Loan and Guarantee Company. She was then sold at Callao to Silvino Cavalie.

Citations

References
Bastock, John (1988), Ships on the Australia Station, Child & Associates Publishing Pty Ltd; Frenchs Forest, Australia. 

1872 ships
Ships built in New South Wales
Victorian-era naval ships of the United Kingdom
Maritime incidents in April 1875